Cold Waters is a 2017 submarine simulation video game developed and published by Killerfish Games.

It is a "spiritual successor" to the 1988 submarine simulation video game  Red Storm Rising by MicroProse.

The game sees the player take the command of a US submarine in 1968, 1984 or 2002 during a hypothetical World War III facing off against either the Soviet Union or the People's Republic of China with the player being tasked with different missions to accomplish while avoiding being destroyed.

References

External links

2017 video games
Naval video games
Single-player video games
Submarine simulation video games
PlayStation 4 games
Video games developed in Australia
Video games set in 1968
Video games set in 1984
Windows games
World War III video games
MacOS games